Carlos Berlocq was the defending champion, but lost to João Sousa in the semifinals.
Pablo Cuevas won his first ATP World Tour title, defeating Sousa in the final, 6–2, 6–1.

Seeds
The top four seeds receive a bye into the second round.

Draw

Finals

Top half

Bottom half

Qualifying

Seeds

Qualifiers

Qualifying draw

First qualifier

Second qualifier

Third qualifier

Fourth qualifier

External Links
 Main draw
 Qualifying draw

Swedish Open - Singles
2014 Singles